The 2017–18 1. FSV Mainz 05 season is the 113th season in the football club's history and 9th consecutive and 12th overall season in the top flight of German football, the Bundesliga, having been promoted from the 2. Bundesliga in 2009. In addition to the domestic league, Mainz 05 also are participating in this season's edition of the domestic cup, the DFB-Pokal. This is the 7th season for Mainz in the Opel Arena, located in Mainz, Rhineland-Palatinate, Germany. The season covers a period from 1 July 2017 to 30 June 2018.

Players

Squad information

Competitions

Overview

Bundesliga

League table

Results summary

Results by round

Matches

DFB-Pokal

References

1. FSV Mainz 05 seasons
Mainz 05, 1. FSV